Cosme Damián Saavedra (27 September 1901 – 3 July 1967) was an Argentine cyclist. He competed in three events at the 1924 Summer Olympics and two events at the 1928 Summer Olympics.

References

External links
 

1901 births
1967 deaths
Argentine male cyclists
Olympic cyclists of Argentina
Cyclists at the 1924 Summer Olympics
Cyclists at the 1928 Summer Olympics
Sportspeople from Mendoza Province